Norman Eric Kirk  (6 January 1923 – 31 August 1974) was a New Zealand politician who served as the 29th prime minister of New Zealand from 1972 until his sudden death in 1974.

Born into poverty in Southern Canterbury, Kirk left school at age 13 and joined the New Zealand Labour Party in 1943. He was mayor of Kaiapoi from 1953 until 1957, when he was elected to the New Zealand Parliament. He became the leader of his party in 1964. He stressed the need for regional economic development and affirmed New Zealand's solidarity with Australia in adopting independent and mutually beneficial foreign policy. Having withdrawn New Zealand troops from Vietnam upon taking office, he was highly critical of US foreign policy. The same year, he strongly opposed French nuclear tests in the Pacific, and threatened to break off diplomatic relations if they continued. He promoted racial equality at home and abroad; his government prevented the South African rugby team from touring New Zealand during 1973. However, his government has been criticised for the launching of the Dawn Raids, the aggressive crackdown on alleged overstayers that near-exclusively targeted Pasifika New Zealanders. Kirk relented to public pressure and discontinued the raids in April 1974.

Kirk had a reputation as the most formidable debater of his time and once famously said that "there are four things that matter to people: they have to have somewhere to live, they have to have food to eat, they have to have clothing to wear, and they have to have something to hope for," often misquoted as "somewhere to live, someone to love, somewhere to work and something to hope for." In private, he suffered from obesity and work exhaustion; his health rapidly deteriorated in the winter of 1974, and he died suddenly on 31 August that year. His death shocked the nation and led to an outpouring of grief; he is the most recent New Zealand Prime Minister to die in office. He was given a combined state funeral and tangi in two locations, with a combination of European and Māori rites. Owing to his energy, charisma and powerful oratory, as well as his untimely death, Kirk remains one of the most popular New Zealand prime ministers. He was succeeded as head of government by Bill Rowling, who lost the subsequent election and remained party leader until 1981.

Early life and family

Born in Waimate, a town in South Canterbury, New Zealand, Norman Kirk came from a poor background, and his household could not afford things such as daily newspapers or a radio. His father, also named Norman Kirk, was a carpenter, while his mother Vera Janet (née Jury) had migrated from the Wairarapa. Throughout his life, it was often speculated that Norman Kirk had Māori whakapapa, and was of mixed Kāi Tahu ancestry. This led to allegations that Kirk was passing as Pākehā. It was also claimed that Kirk had Māori relatives, which is true at least through his great-niece Jo Luxton, the current Member of the House of Representatives for Rangitata. While Kirk never denied being Māori, a study of his genealogy found no evidence he was Kāi Tahu and he never publicly identified himself as such.

While very intelligent, Kirk did not perform well academically. He left school shortly before he turned thirteen after his father lost his job. Despite this, however, he enjoyed reading, and often visited libraries. In particular, he enjoyed the study of history and geography.

After leaving school, Kirk worked in a number of jobs, initially as an assistant roof-painter and later as a stationary engine driver, operating boilers in various factories. His health, however, deteriorated, and when the New Zealand Army called him up for military service in 1941 it found him medically unfit. After recovering somewhat, he returned to work, holding a number of different jobs.

In 1943, Norman Kirk married Lucy Ruth Miller, known as Ruth, who was born in Taumarunui. The couple had three sons and two daughters. In 1975 Ruth Kirk was named Dame Commander of the Order of the British Empire (DBE). In 1974, while her husband was Prime Minister, she became patron of the Society for the Protection of the Unborn Child. She took part in anti-abortion protest marches in Wellington and Hamilton. She died on 20 March 2000, aged 77.

Early political career
Also in 1943, Kirk joined the Labour Party's branch in Kaiapoi, where he and his wife had decided to build a house. Kirk bought a  section at 12 Carew Street for just NZ£40 (compared to today's land valuation of NZ$126,000). Owing to a shortage of funds and building materials following World War II, Kirk built the house himself entirely, right down to the casting of the bricks. The house still stands today, albeit with an extension at the back and a hipped corrugated iron roof to replace the original leak-susceptible flat malthoid roof.

In 1951, Kirk became Chairman of the party's Hurunui electorate committee. In 1953, Kirk led Labour to a surprising victory in elections for Kaiapoi's local council, and he became the youngest mayor in the country at age 30.

As mayor, Kirk showed great creativity and implemented many changes. He surprised officials by studying issues intensely, often emerging with better knowledge of his options than the people functioning as his advisors. He resigned as mayor on 15 January 1958 and moved his family to Christchurch after being elected MP for the  electorate.

Member of Parliament

In 1954, Kirk stood as the Labour candidate for the Hurunui seat. While he increased Labour's share of the vote considerably, he did not win. Following this, Kirk sought the Labour nomination for a by-election in Riccarton, but ultimately withdrew from the selection contest. He then turned his attention to winning nomination in the seat of Lyttelton, which Labour surprisingly lost to the National Party in a previous election. Kirk beat five better known and connected candidates including Mayor of Lyttelton Frederick Briggs and Lyttelton Borough Councillor Gladys Boyd for the nomination. At the 1957 general election Kirk won the Lyttelton seat and became a Member of Parliament. In 1969 he transferred to the Sydenham seat which he held until his death.

Throughout his political career, Kirk promoted the welfare state, supporting government spending for housing, health, employment, and education. As such, Kirk often appeared as a champion for ordinary New Zealanders. His working-class background also gave him some advantage, as ordinary voters saw many other politicians as out-of-touch and aloof. Gradually, Kirk began to rise through Labour's internal hierarchy, becoming vice-president of the party in 1963 and president of the party in 1964. He came to the attention of media and colleagues as a potential future leader. He stood for the position of Deputy Leader in 1963 following the death of Fred Hackett but was defeated by Hugh Watt. Despite lacking Watt's length of service or ministerial experience Kirk only lost by one vote, a surprising show of support.

With the memory of the "Black Budget" still plaguing Labour leader Arnold Nordmeyer's profile and many within the party believed that it was time for a fresh start. In 1965 a group of mainly younger Labour MPs formed a group who became dedicated to replace Nordmeyer with Kirk, becoming known as the "Mafia". At the end of 1965 he successfully challenged Arnold Nordmeyer for the parliamentary leadership, becoming Leader of the Opposition. As leader Kirk assembled a more formal shadow cabinet system amongst the Labour caucus than had been seen in the past wishing to boost the profile of his senior MPs. However, he found it challenging to avoid it being composed mainly of Auckland and Christchurch based MPs.

Using the slogan "Make things happen", Kirk led Labour into the 1969 general election — the party did not win a majority, but it did increase both its share of the vote and number of seats to 44.2% and 39.

Prime Minister

In February 1972 Keith Holyoake resigned as Prime Minister and was replaced by Jack Marshall. Not even this could blunt Labour's campaign slogan, "It's Time – Time for a change, time for Labour", and on 25 November 1972 Kirk led Labour to victory with a majority of 23 seats.

Soon after entering office, Kirk acquired a reputation as a reforming figure. The conservative Dominion newspaper bestowed its 'Man of the Year' prize on him for "outstanding personal potential for leadership". A few weeks later, on 6 February 1973, Kirk was photographed at a Waitangi Day event holding the hand of a small Māori boy; as Kirk was recognised as Pākehā, the iconic picture seemed to symbolise a new era of partnership between New Zealand's people.

Kirk set a frenetic pace implementing a great number of new policies. In particular, the Kirk government had a far more active foreign policy than its predecessor, taking great trouble to expand New Zealand's links with Asia and Africa. Immediately after his election as Prime Minister, Kirk withdrew all New Zealand troops from Vietnam, ending that nation's eight-year involvement in the Vietnam War and causing high levels of public support for Labour. The Kirk government also abolished Compulsory Military Training (conscription) in New Zealand; since then the New Zealand Defence Force has remained an all-volunteer professional force. Kirk also strengthened relations with the Australian Labor Party and its leader Gough Whitlam. Like Kirk, Whitlam had come to power in 1972 as the first Labor Prime Minister in a considerable time; Kirk had been preceded by 12 years of National Party government, while Whitlam had succeeded a Coalition government that had lasted 23 years. Kirk desired for the two nascent leaders to work together, to foster a boldly independent foreign policy separate from the United Kingdom or the United States. Despite their relative success together in their mutually short periods in office, it is known that Kirk and Whitlam, in private, did not get along and even disliked one another. Kirk was a closer friend to Lee Kuan Yew, whom he regarded as his mentor, and to Harold Wilson (despite wanting to escape the influence of Britain), than to Whitlam.

Two subjects in particular caused comment; one: Kirk's strong protest against French nuclear-weapons testing in the Pacific Ocean which led to his government, along with Australia, taking France to the International Court of Justice in 1972 and him sending two New Zealand navy frigates, HMNZS Canterbury and Otago, into the test zone area at Mururoa Atoll in a symbolic act of protest in 1973. The other: his refusal to allow a visit by a South African rugby team, a decision he made because the apartheid régime in South Africa would not accept racial integration for that sport. He was also highly critical of US foreign policy, speaking before the United Nations of the US involvement in the coup d'état in Chile in 1973.

The Kirk government was also notable for a number of national identity building policies. The government began the tradition of New Zealand Day in 1973, and the government introduced legislation in 1974 to declare Queen Elizabeth II as "Queen of New Zealand".

Kirk's government was more environmentally conscious than preceding ones. It was elected on a platform that included a strong endorsement of the ideals of Save Manapouri campaign. In February 1973, Kirk honoured his election pledge and instructed the electricity department not to raise the level of Lake Manapouri. He created an independent body, the Guardians of Lake Manapouri, Monowai, and Te Anau (composed of leading members of the protest) to oversee management of the lake levels.

Kirk appointed Bill Rowling as Minister of Finance. The Labour government enjoyed a record budget surplus in its first year and revalued the currency. However, the slowing global economy, an unprecedented rise in oil prices and a rapid rise in government expenditure led to soaring inflation by 1974.

The Kirk government attracted controversy in March 1974 for starting the Dawn Raids, a series of police raids that primarily targeted Pacific Islanders for overstaying. The government stopped the raids and issued an amnesty in April 1974, but they were later restarted by the Muldoon Government.

Illness and death

During his time as Prime Minister, Kirk kept up an intense schedule, refusing to reduce his workload by any significant degree and rarely taking time off (the Chatham Islands was his favourite retreat). Kirk ignored advice from several doctors and from Bob Tizard and Warren Freer to "take care of himself" and to reduce his heavy consumption of Coca-Cola and alcohol (beer, plus later whisky or gin), saying he would have a "short but happy life". Though a non-smoker, he had dysentery and exhibited symptoms of undiagnosed diabetes.

By 1974 he had difficulty in breathing, eating and sleeping. In April Kirk had an operation to remove varicose veins from both legs at once despite advice to have two operations. Doctors and colleagues were urging him to take time off; on 26 August Social Credit leader Bruce Beetham advised him to take a couple of months off to recover. 

On 15 August 1974 he decided to take two days off, and on 26 August he decided to have six weeks of complete rest. He had been checked over by many doctors, and an examination by Professor Tom O’Donnell on 27 August confirmed that he had an enlarged heart gravely weakened by embolisms, and which was not pumping regularly enough to get sufficient oxygen into his bloodstream; one lung was two-thirds incapacitated by the clot; and his stomach was very sore as his liver was swollen with retained fluid. He went into the Home of Compassion Hospital, Island Bay, Wellington on 28 August. 

He rang and reminisced with close colleagues, and his bed was covered with official papers. On Saturday 31 August he told his wife Ruth, who had been told of his serious situation and came to Wellington, "I am dying .. please don't tell anyone". Soon after 9 pm, while watching a police drama on television (Softly, Softly: Taskforce with Stratford Johns on NZBC TV), he slowly slid from a sitting position. He died of a pulmonary embolism when a blood clot released from a vein into his heart cut off the blood flow and stopped the heart. O'Donnell signed his death certificate.

Kirk's death shocked the nation. Biographer Michael Bassett states, "There followed an outpouring of grief paralleled only by that which had followed [Prime Minister] M. J. Savage's death in 1940". Bill Rowling succeeded Kirk as Prime Minister. His son, John Kirk, won the resulting Sydenham by-election in November 1974.

While colleagues had been urging him to take some time off, none were aware of the seriousness of his last illness. Bob Harvey, the Labour Party president, said that Kirk was "a robust man" with the "constitution of a horse".  He proposed a Royal Commission to investigate rumours that he had been killed, perhaps with contact poison, by the CIA. This story returned during the 1999 visit of American President Bill Clinton to New Zealand.

Funeral
After a lying-in-state in Parliament House from 2 to 4 September, there was a large official funeral in Wellington Cathedral of St Paul, on Wednesday 4 September attended by Prince Charles, Cook Islands Premier Albert Henry, and Australian Prime Minister Gough Whitlam; then on 5 September another service, also inter-denominational, in the Christchurch Town Hall followed by a simple burial service in his hometown Waimate. He was buried near his mother's grave; the burial service was delayed as the RNZAF Hercules could not land at Waimate and the procession hurried by road to meet the daylight requirement for burials. Memorial services were held around New Zealand, and on 26 September in Westminster Abbey, London.

Popular culture
The New Zealand pop band Ebony wrote the song "Big Norm", featuring tongue-in-cheek lyrics praising Kirk. In 1974, it reached No 4 in the charts and Ebony won a New Zealand music RATA award for group of the year. The last telegram Kirk sent before his death was to Ebony congratulating them on their win.

See also

Electoral history of Norman Kirk
List of heads of state and government who died in office
List of members of the New Zealand Parliament who died in office

References

Bibliography

Further reading

External links 

  Prime Ministers of New Zealand: Norman Kirk
 NZBC Network News – Prime Minister Norman Kirk's Death

|-

|-

|-

|-

|-

1923 births
1974 deaths
New Zealand Labour Party MPs
New Zealand foreign ministers
New Zealand Labour Party leaders
People from Waimate
Prime Ministers of New Zealand
Train drivers
New Zealand humanitarians
Leaders of the Opposition (New Zealand)
Mayors of places in Canterbury, New Zealand
People from Kaiapoi
New Zealand MPs for Christchurch electorates
Members of the New Zealand House of Representatives
New Zealand members of the Privy Council of the United Kingdom
Unsuccessful candidates in the 1954 New Zealand general election
Deaths from pulmonary embolism
Burials at Waimate Cemetery